Armin von Gerkan (November 30, 1885 in Subate, Latvia – December 22, 1969 in Garstedt, present Norderstedt, Germany) was a Baltic German classical archaeologist and member of an aristocratic family. He was an expert for archaeological building research and joint founder of Robert Johann Koldewey Society  (Koldewey-Gesellschaft e.V.)  in Berlin. Gerkan is a seminal figure in ancient architectural history.  His report "Griechische Stadtanlagen" (1924) is still consulted today as a basic text for ancient city planning, and his methodology has been widely adopted.

Architect Meinhard von Gerkan (born 1935 Riga) is a relative.

Sources 
 Biography at the Dictionary of Art Historians
German Bibliography

1885 births
1969 deaths
People from Ilūkste Municipality
People from Courland Governorate
Baltic-German people
German archaeologists
Baltische Landeswehr personnel
20th-century archaeologists
Latvian emigrants to Germany